The 2009 Cork Junior A Hurling Championship was the 112th staging of the Cork Junior A Hurling Championship since its establishment by the Cork County Board in 1895. The championship began on 10 October 2009 and ended on 1 November 2009.

On 1 November 2009, Fermoy won the championship following a 1-14 to 0-10 defeat of Cloughduv in the final. This was their first championship title in the grade.

Castlemartyr's Evan O'Keeffe and Cloughduv's Darragh Ring were the championship's top scorer.

Qualification

Results

First round

Semi-finals

Final

Championship statistics

Top scorers

Overall

In a single game

References

Cork Junior Hurling Championship
Cork Junior Hurling Championship